An encore is a performance added to the end of a concert.

Encore(s) may also refer to:

Businesses and products

Computing
 Encore (software), a music notation software
 Encore Computer, an early maker of parallel computers and real-time software
 Encore, Inc., a software publishing and distribution company
 EnCore Processor, a configurable and extendable microprocessor
 Adobe Encore, a DVD authoring software tool
 Z8 Encore!, a microcontroller by ZiLOG

Transportation
 Encore, a train on Amtrak's Hiawatha Service
 Buick Encore, a car produced by GM from 2012 onwards
 Norwegian Encore, a Norwegian Cruise Line passenger ship
 WestJet Encore, a Canadian airline

Other
 Encore Books, a defunct American bookstore chain
 Encore Capital Group, an American financial-services company
 Encore Data Products, an American manufacturer of audio and video equipment
 Encore Enterprises, an American real-estate company
 Encore Las Vegas, a casino resort in Las Vegas, Nevada, US
 Encore Studio, a music platform launched by Kid Cudi

Film and television

Film
 Encore (1951 film), an American anthology film
 Encore (1988 film) or Once More, a French film directed by Paul Vecchiali
 Encore (1996 film), a French film directed by Pascal Bonitzer
 Encore, Once More Encore!, a 1992 Russian film

Television channels and series
 Encore+, a YouTube channel sponsored by the Canadian Media Fund
 Encore (TV series), a 1960 Canadian drama anthology series
 Encore! (TV series), a 2019–2020 American reality series
 Encore! Encore!, a 1998–1999 American sitcom

 Starz Encore, formerly Encore, an American premium television channel

Television episodes
 "Encore" (Brimstone)
 "Encore" (Law & Order)
 "Encore" (Mission: Impossible)
 "Encore" (So Weird)

Music
 Encore! (musician) (born 1974), German singer
 Encore HSC, an annual performance at the Sydney Opera House
 Encore School for Strings, an American summer music institute
 Encore Series, a series of concert recordings by The Who
 Encores!, a program presented by New York City Center since 1994

Albums
 Encore (Anderson East album), 2018
 Encore (Bobby Vinton album), 1980
 Encore (Clark Sisters album), 2008
 Encore (David Garrett album), 2008
 Encore (DJ Snake album), 2016
 Encore (Eberhard Weber album), 2015
 Encore (Elaine Paige album), 1995
 Encore (Eddie Bert album), 1955
 Encore (Eminem album) or the title song (see below), 2004
 Encore (George Jones album), 1981
 Encore! (Jeanne Pruett album), 1979
 Encore (Johnny Cash album), 1981
 Encore (Klaus Nomi album), 1983
 Encore (Lionel Richie album), 2002
 Encore (The Louvin Brothers album), 1961
 Encore (Lynn Anderson album), 1981
 Encore (Marina Prior album), 2013
 Encore (Marti Webb album), 1985
 Encore (Russell Watson album), 2002
 Encore (S.H.E album), 2004
 Encore (Sam Cooke album), 1958
 Encore (Sarah Brightman album), 2002
 Encore (The Specials album), 2019
 Encore (Tangerine Dream album), 1977
 Encore (1988 Wanda Jackson album), 1988
 Encore (2021 Wanda Jackson album), 2021
 Encore! (Travels with My Cello – Volume 2), by Julian Lloyd Webber, 1986
 Encore: Live and Direct, by Scooter, 2002
 Encore: Live in Concert, by Argent, 1974
 Encore: More Greatest Hits, by America, 1991
 Encore: Movie Partners Sing Broadway, by Barbra Streisand, 2016
 Encore Woody Herman–1963
 Encore, by David Allan Coe, 1981
 Encore, by Mickey Gilley, 1980
 Encore... For Future Generations, by 4Him, 2006
 Encores (2nd Chapter of Acts album), 1981
 Encores (Jimmy Buffett album), 2010
 Encores (Stan Kenton album), 1949
 American Idol Season 5: Encores, 2006
 Encores (EP), by Dire Straits, 1993

Songs
 "Encore" (Cheryl Lynn song), 1983
 "Encore" (Eminem song), 2004
 "Encore" (Jay-Z song), 2003
 "Encore" (Yoasobi song), 2021
 "Encore", by Brooke Candy from Sexorcism, 2019
 "Encore", by Catfish and the Bottlemen from The Balance, 2019
 "Encore", by Delta Goodrem from Wings of the Wild, 2016
 "Encore", by Got7, 2021
 "Encore", by Graham Nash from This Path Tonight, 2016
 "Encore", by Jason Derulo from Jason Derulo, 2010
 "Encore", by KSI from Keep Up, 2016
 "Encore", by Red Hot Chili Peppers from The Getaway, 2016

Other uses
 Encore (Australian magazine), defunct film and entertainment industry magazine
 Encore Award, a British literary award
 'Encore' mandarin, a citrus cultivar
 Encore Theatre Magazine, a British online publication
 Operation Encore, part of the Allies' Italian Campaign in  World War II

See also
 Rerun, a repeat airing of a radio or television program